Pathani Suit is an ethnic outfit for men in the South Asian culture. Basically it is a Muslim dress similar to Salwar kameez. It comprises three garments Kurta (along with tunic), Salwaar (a loosely gathered trouser), and a vest (a waistcoat), which is optional. Pashtun suit is popular among men as formal wear and worn on special occasions such as marriages and festivals. It is also called Khan suit and Pashtun suit.

Evolution 
The Pathani suit has evolved from a traditional Pashtun Dress 'Perahan tunban' or ‘partoog kameez’. Perhan or kameez is similar to the Kurta, a top garment, and Tunban or partoog is a lower garment.

Characteristics and Fashion

Characteristics 
The Pathani suit is a three-piece set of a long Kurta, Salwaar, and a vest (a waistcoat). The jacket is an optional choice. Pathani suit goes well with a Nehru jacket. The Kurta and salwar are of the most same color.

Fashion 
Pathani suit is a masculine outfit. Shah Rukh Khan wore a black suit in his iconic role of a don in the movie Raees (film).

The Khan-dress or Pathani suit is the daily dress among the Bollywood  heroes.

See also 

 Perahan tunban 
 Patiala salwar
 Salwar The Punjabi Salwar is part of the Punjabi suit which is the traditional attire of the Punjab region of the Indian subcontinent.

References

Pashtun culture
Clothing by ethnicity
South Asian culture
Pakistani clothing
Indian clothing
Punjabi clothing
History of Asian clothing